Abraxas privata is a species of moth belonging to the family Geometridae. It was described by Max Bastelberger in 1905. It is known from Sumba and Timor.

References

Abraxini
Moths of Asia
Moths described in 1905